Hazard Community and Technical College (HCTC) is a public community college in Hazard, Kentucky. It is part of the Kentucky Community and Technical College System (KCTCS). Established as Hazard Community College in 1968, the name of the college was changed to Hazard Community and Technical College in 2003. HCTC has five campuses: the Hazard Campus and Technical Campus, both in Hazard, the Lees College Campus in Jackson (formerly Lees College, est. 1883), the Leslie County Center, and the Knott County Branch. HCTC is accredited by the Southern Association of Colleges and Schools (SACS).

Service area 

The primary service area of HCTC includes:

 Breathitt County
 Knott County
 Lee County
 Leslie County
 Letcher County
 Owsley County
 Perry County
 Wolfe County

Campuses
Hazard Community and Technical College (HCTC) consists of several campus locations as well as offering classes online.

HCTC Hazard Campus
HCTC Hazard Campus is located right off Highway 15 in Hazard, Kentucky. Selected Allied Health classes also are offered in the Bailey-Stumbo Building at the University of Kentucky Center for Rural Health adjacent to the Appalachian Regional Medical Center in Hazard, located 4 miles from the Hazard Campus. The campus includes the First Federal Center (FFC), the J. Marvin Jolly Classroom Center (JCC), and the Challenger Learning Center.

HCTC Lees College Campus
HCTC Lees College Campus is located in Jackson, Kentucky. The campus consists of Jackson Hall, J. Phil Smith Administration Building, Van Meter Gymnasium, Telford Computer Center, Library/Science Building, and the Breathitt County Life Skills Center.

HCTC Technical Campus
HCTC Technical Campus is located 3 miles from the Hazard Campus in Hazard, Kentucky, and is the home of many of HCTC s technical programs. Buildings include Devert Owens Building, Walter Prater Education Center, Industrial Education Building, and Heavy Equipment Building. The Technical Campus also houses HCTC s Kentucky Coal Academy and Smart Energy Training Center.

HCTC Leslie County Center
HCTC Leslie County Center is located 21 miles west of the Hazard Campus in Hyden, Kentucky. This location also houses the renowned Kentucky School of Bluegrass and Traditional Music. Classes toward the Associate in Arts and Associate in Science degrees, as well as specialized workshops, are offered at this center.

HCTC Knott County Branch
HCTC Knott County Branch is located 26 miles east of the Hazard Campus in Hindman, Kentucky, and offers classes toward the Associate in Arts, Associate in Science and Associate in Fine Arts degrees. The Kentucky School of Craft facility is located at this branch and offers specialized training and workshops throughout the year. A key community partnership is also maintained through this branch location with the Appalachian Artisan Center, Hindman Settlement School and the Knott County Opportunity Center.

References

External links
Official website

Kentucky Community and Technical College System
Educational institutions established in 1968
1968 establishments in Kentucky
Universities and colleges accredited by the Southern Association of Colleges and Schools
Education in Perry County, Kentucky
Education in Breathitt County, Kentucky
Education in Knott County, Kentucky
Education in Leslie County, Kentucky
Buildings and structures in Perry County, Kentucky
Buildings and structures in Breathitt County, Kentucky
Buildings and structures in Knott County, Kentucky
Buildings and structures in Leslie County, Kentucky
Hazard, Kentucky